Sranan Tongo, or for short Sranan, an English-based creole language spoken by many people in Suriname, is not an officially recognized language. Until the middle of the 20th century, most written texts in Sranan, seen at the time as a low-prestige language, used a spelling that was not standardized but based on Dutch orthography, recording an approximation of how Sranan words sound to Dutch ears. In view of the considerable differences between the phonologies of Sranan and Dutch, this was not a satisfactory situation.

With the emergence of a movement striving for the emancipation of Sranan as a respectable language, the need for a phonology-based orthography was felt. A more suitable orthography developed as an informal consensus from the publications of linguists studying Sranan and related creoles. For every-day use, the Dutch-based spelling remained common, while some literary authors adopted (variants of) the linguistic spelling.

To end this chaotic situation, the Surinamese government commissioned a committee of linguists and writers to define a standard spelling, which was adopted and came into force in 1986. This standard basically followed the linguistic consensus. However, as the language is not being taught in schools, while Dutch is, most speakers are not clearly aware of the principles on which this spelling is based and keep using a Dutchish, varying spelling.

The main points are summarized in the following tables. In the IPA columns, a comma-separated list indicates allophones. The “Dutch” spelling may vary from writer to writer, or even within a single text.

Monophthongs

Diphthongs

Consonants

*When syllable-final, the  slightly nasalizes the preceding vowel. This pronunciation is reflected in the “Dutch” spelling by writing ⟨ng⟩, as in “Sranang”, but not in the standard spelling. In other (not word-final) cases  is not an allophone of  but a phoneme in its own right, always spelled ⟨ng⟩, as in tongo
(Note that the combination ⟨ng⟩ in this word represents two separate phonemes, similar to the pair ⟨th⟩ in English hothead). In the standard orthography, the spelling ⟨k⟩ is retained in all cases; ⟨ty⟩ is only found before ⟨a⟩, ⟨o⟩ and ⟨u⟩, as in tyari and tyopu. Exceptionally, the variants tye and tyika are accepted spellings for ke and kika used as interjections.

Assimilation

An  before the labial consonants ,  and  tends towards , as in granpa.

Elision of vowels and gemination

Some common particles exist in two versions, with and without an initial consonant: na → a; de → e; go → o. While this may historically correspond to the elision of a consonant, it is not denoted as such in the spelling. In contrast, the elision of a vowel, common in speech, is denoted orthographically by an apostrophe. For example, mi o naki dalèk → m’ o naki dalèk. This is frequently done in informal speech when otherwise a hiatus would result. Another common case is a /CV1'CV2/ combination in which the two consonants are the same, as in mama, fufuru and wiwiri. (As in these examples, the vowels are also often the same.) The vowel between the consonants may be elided, resulting in a geminated consonant: m’ma, f’furu, w’wiri. A more drastic elision with gemination is seen in ferferi → f’feri.

Some examples

Notes

Phonologies by language
Indo-European Latin-script orthographies
English-based pidgins and creoles
Sranan Tongo